Dave Abrams, better known as DJ Solo (often stylized DJ SOLO), is an American DJ, producer, rapper and visual artist. He is a part of the Cypress Hill affiliated Soul Assassins collective. His production credits include La Coka Nostra, Everlast, Planet Asia, GZA, B-Real, Adil Omar, Mitchy Slick and others. He has released several mash-ups, remixes and a compilation album of his production work, titled My MPC Is A Pipe Bomb, and produced on the Soul Assassins Soul Assassins: Intermission album. He also hosted 40's & Blunts, a weekly internet show.

Discography
DJ SOLO's Alice In Wonderland
Requiem For The Living
A Mile In My Shoes
Breaking Bass
Soul Assassins: Classic & Exclusive
Shut Up & Dance
SOLOMash
Jitterbug Driveby (with Roger Jao)
Hair Metal Hero (with Roger Jao)
Electric Limo
My MPC Is A Pipe Bomb
Open Up The Trunk
Crush.Kill.Destroy
DubstepFM: The Dented Sessions 12-13-09
Fucking & Punching
In Between Dreams (with Roger Jao)

Remixes
The Office (DJ Solo Remix) (2010)
Ramones - Blitzkrieg Bop (DJ Solo Remix) (2011)
Umphrey's McGee - "The Domino Theory" & "Deeper" (DJ Solo Remix) (2012)
Mitchy Slick x Excision x Downlink - Bass Chasers (DJ Solo's Mashup (2012)

References

External links
Official Site for Mixes
Official Myspace
Soul Assassins Official Site

American hip hop DJs
American hip hop musicians
Hip hop record producers
Midwest hip hop musicians
Musicians from Chicago
Living people
Year of birth missing (living people)